Night and Dream is a small jazz combo album recorded by pianist Toshiko Akiyoshi in 1994 and released by Nippon Crown Records.

Track listing 
"Night Waltz" (Akiyoshi) – 6:16 
"Darn That Dream" (DeLange, Van Heusen) – 8:24 
"Elusive Dream" (Akiyoshi) – 7:26 
"Get Out and Get Under the Moon" (Jerome, Shay, Tobias) – 8:35 
"When You Wish upon a Star" (Harline, Washington) – 6:23 
"Dream" (Mercer) – 6:09 
"The Night Has a Thousand Eyes" (Bernier, Brainin) – 8:18 
"Round About Midnight" (Hanighen, Monk, Williams) – 6:31

Personnel
Toshiko Akiyoshi – piano 
Mickey Roker – drums
Peter Washington – bass
Joe Magnarelli – trumpet, flugelhorn (tracks 1, 2, 3, 6, 7)
Walt Weiskopf – tenor saxophone (tracks 1, 2, 3, 6, 7)
Scott Robinson – alto saxophone, baritone saxophone, bass clarinet (tracks 1, 2, 3, 4, 6)

References
Nippon Crown CRCJ-91006 
Night & Dream at [ Allmusic.com]

Toshiko Akiyoshi albums
1994 albums